Yamaqan (also Romanized as Yamaqān, Yamagan, and Yamqān; also known as Damqān) is a village in Chuqur Rural District, Tarom Sofla District, Qazvin County, Qazvin Province, Iran. At the 2006 census, its population was 77, in 23 families.

References 

Populated places in Qazvin County